Nyvky is a neighbourhood in Kyiv, Ukraine. It belongs to Shevchenkivskyi District of Kyiv. It is surrounded by Svyatoshyn (Sviatoshynskyi District) to the west, Shuliavka to the south-east, Vidradnyi (Solomianskyi District) to the south, Syrets to the east, Vynohradar, and Berkivtsi.

The name of neighborhood Nyvky has nothing to do with the river Nyvka which flows in other parts of Kyiv. The Nyvky neighborhood is located to the east from Svyatoshyn, at the same time Nyvka River flows to the west from Svyatoshyn along Borshchahivka settlements chain. The name of the neighborhood has derived rather from a grainfield that was located along the Brest-Litovsky highway (today Prospect Beresteiska).

In 1850s here was located a khutir Fuzykivka that was established by Fuzyk family from village of Bilychi (today a neighborhood of Kyiv). In 1870s there was a farmstead and a dacha "Nyvky" that was being rented out.

In the beginning of the 20th century, khutir Nyvky was part of Bilhorodka volost, Kyiv county (uyezd). It had 5 homecourts with population of 27 and it also had three brick shops. At that time Nyvky included also such neighborhoods like Vovcha Hora and Rubezhivka.

In 1923 the khutir was merged with the city of Kyiv.

In Nyvky is located National Pedagogical Dragomanov University, Kyiv Exposition Center, Dynamo football school, Nyvky Park, Park Dubky, Dubovyi Hai Park, Kadetskyi Korpus Liceum, Nyvky City business park, Verkon factory.

A metro station (Sviatoshynsko–Brovarska line) was built here in 1970. Near Nyvky is  located Sviatoshyn Airfield. There is a Rubezhivskyi train station located next to Nyvky Park on the Syrets River.

Neighborhoods in Kyiv
Shevchenkivskyi District, Kyiv
Prospect Beresteiskyi